Vladimir Kravchenko (born 16 October 1947) is a Soviet swimmer. He took part in the 1968 Summer Olympics in the 200 m and 400 m individual medley events, but did not reach the finals. His future wife, Tamara Sosnova, also competed in swimming at the same Olympics.

In 1970, he set a new European record in the 200 m medley. Between 1967 and 1971 he won seven national titles and set five national records in the 200 m and 400 m individual medley events.

Since 1989 he competes in the masters category, in which he holds multiple European titles and records. He won a European gold medal in the 4 × 100 m medley relay in 2005, and two bronze medals at world championships in 1995–1997 in breaststroke events. Between 1990 and 2008 he won 24 national titles (USSR, CIS and then Russia) and set 11 Russian records.

References

1947 births
Living people
Russian male swimmers
Male medley swimmers
Swimmers at the 1968 Summer Olympics
Olympic swimmers of the Soviet Union
Soviet male swimmers
Swimmers from Moscow